Dyschirius globosus is a species of ground beetle in the subfamily Scaritinae. It was described by Herbst in 1784.

References

globosus
Beetles described in 1784